Until the End may refer to:

 Until the End (album), an album by Kittie, or the title song
 Until the End (Eleine album) 
 Until the End (EP), an EP by coldrain
 "Until the End" (Breaking Benjamin song)
 "Until the End" (Norah Jones song)
 Until the End, an album by Widescreen Mode
 "Until the End", a song by Asking Alexandria on the album From Death to Destiny
 "Until the End", a song by Avenged Sevenfold on the album Live in the LBC & Diamonds in the Rough
 "Until the End", a song by Limp Bizkit, a non-album track from Results May Vary
 "Until the End", a song by Heavenly from their 2001 album Sign of the Winner
 "Until the End", a song by Hypocrisy from Hypocrisy
 "Until the End", a song by The Nightwatchman from their 2004 album Axis of Justice: Concert Series Volume 1
 Until the End (band), an American metalcore band founded by John Wylie

See also
 Til the End (disambiguation)